Celebrity Deathmatch is a professional wrestling video game by American studio Big Ape Productions, based on the MTV series of the same name. It was available for PlayStation, as well as Microsoft Windows, PlayStation 2 and Xbox. The game features celebrities and movie monsters as playable characters.

Gameplay
In the game, the player needs to hit their opponent several times until the opponent's life meter flashes red, at which point text will show the word Kill!. The winning player then needs to fill up the MTV meter to full. In order to make the happen faster, players can taunt the audience. When in the proper momentum, the player can finish the opponent off by performing their special moves.

Within the match, several boxes containing various power-ups and weapons can be picked up by the players.

Playable characters 
The following characters are playable in the game:

Anna Nicole Smith
Busta Rhymes
Carmen Electra
Carrot Top
Cindy Margolis
Cousin Grimm (Unlockable)
Dennis Rodman
Frankenstein (Unlockable)
Gladiator Nick Diamond (Unlockable)
Jerry Springer
Marilyn Manson
Mr. T
Miss Cleo
The Mummy (Unlockable)
*NSYNC - Chris Kirkpatrick, JC Chasez, Joey Fatone, Justin Timberlake, and Lance Bass
Ron Jeremy
Shannen Doherty
Tommy Lee
Wizard Johnny Gomez (Unlockable)
The Wolfman (Unlockable)
Zartax the Alien (Unlockable)

Development 
Celebrity Deathmatch was originally scheduled to be available for the Gamecube as well. However shortly prior to release, its publisher Gotham Games quietly cancelled this version. A source close to development cited "programming issues" as the reason behind the decision.

Reception

The PC, PlayStation 2 and Xbox versions received "unfavorable" reviews according to the review aggregation website Metacritic.

In his review for GameSpot, Alex Navarro called the gameplay "absolutely horrid" and criticised the "complete lack of any worthwhile features". He also was critical of the lack of different modes. In a scathing review of the PS2 version, Gamespy's, Matthew Freeman said that the game "dies a faltering and unfunny death" adding that the fighting system was "unresponsive, illogical, and incredibly easy anyway". He also complained about the AI that he called "idiotic, unfocused, and hapless."

Tom Edwards for Computer Gaming World, reviewing the PC version, opined that the game would have been more bearable if the included celebrities were characters "for whom you have actual dislike rather than disinterest".

References

External links
 
 Celebrity Deathmatch at Softpedia

Celebrity Deathmatch
Satirical video games
2003 video games
Multiplayer and single-player video games
PlayStation 2 games
Professional wrestling games
Video games based on television series
Video games based on real people
Video games developed in the United States
Windows games
Xbox games
Cultural depictions of actors
Cultural depictions of pop musicians
Cultural depictions of rock musicians
Cultural depictions of hip hop musicians
Cultural depictions of sportspeople
Cultural depictions of Mr. T
Cultural depictions of Ron Jeremy
Cultural depictions of Jerry Springer
Cultural depictions of Anna Nicole Smith
Coresoft games
Fiction about death games